Prakash Punj or Bahu Uddeshiya Prakash Kendra and Udyan (Multi Purpose light centre and Garden) is under construction park at Guru Ka Bag near Bazzar samiti in Patna Sahib area.

Overview
The Prakash Punj is being built at a cost of 54.16 crore to keep the memory of 350th prakash parv of Guru Gobind Singh over the land of 10 Acres. The entire structure will be open from all sides and aim to complete it before Prakash Parv in 2020

Attraction
It will have theme park, two exhibition halls, Auditorium and four commemorative gates in the name of four sons of the Guru Govind Singh. Will known as Baba Ajeet Singh Dwar, Baba Fateh Singh Dwar, Baba Jujhar singh Dwar and Baba Jorawar Singh Dwar and five Takhts Paunta Sahib, Nandad Sahib, keshgarh Sahib, Hemkund Sahib and Patna Sahib. The theme park would be one its kind narrating Guru Govind Singh's life and information about Sikh religion through various models and plaques, Special fountains and landscaping would be add to the attraction. The exhibition halls would exhibit paintings and similar things related to the Sikh religion in general and Guru Gobind Singh in particular. The auditorium would be used to organise various programmes in connection with religious functions and other relative activities

See also
 Takht Sri Patna Sahib
 Guru Ka Bag
 Gurdwara Bal Lila Maini Sangat
 Gurdwara Handi Sahib

References
 Madan Kumar (10 September 2018).complete-prakash-kendra-in-14-months-says-nitish Times of India
 Sanjeev Kumar Verma (23 November 2017). centre-s-rs-50cr-for-sikh-fest-centre The Telegraph
 27 February 2018 patna-city-prakash-punj-will-be-constructed-at-a-cost-of-5088-crores-near-guru-ka-bagh Dainik Jagran
 9 September 2018  bihar-cm-nitish-kumar-lays-foundation-stone-of-multipurpose-prakash-kendra-in-patna-city Prabhat Khabar

Parks in India